Plica rayi,  Ray's treerunner, is a species of South American lizard in the family Tropiduridae. The species is found in Colombia and Venezuela.

References

Plica
Lizards of South America
Reptiles of Colombia
Reptiles of Venezuela
Reptiles described in 2013